Phytoecia anteatra is a species of beetle in the family Cerambycidae. It was described by Stephan von Breuning in 1966. It is known from Angola.

References

Endemic fauna of Angola
Phytoecia
Beetles described in 1966